Sebastian Nebyla (born 25 January 2002) is a Slovak professional footballer who plays as a midfielder for Slovak Super Liga club DAC Dunajská Streda.

Club career

Youth career at West Ham
A former youth academy player of Spartak Trnava, Nebyla joined West Ham United in 2018. He spent two seasons at the club, playing for under-18 and under-23 teams in Professional Development League.

DAC Dunajská Streda
On 4 August 2020, Slovak club DAC unajská Streda announced the signing of Nebyla on a two-year deal. On 27 September 2020, he made senior team debut for Dunajská Streda's farm team Šamorín in a 2–1 league win against Petržalka.

International career
Born in Germany, Nebyla represents Slovakia at youth international level.

References

External links
 

2002 births
Living people
People from Gütersloh
German people of Slovak descent
Sportspeople from Detmold (region)
Association football midfielders
Slovak footballers
Slovak expatriate footballers
Slovakia youth international footballers
Slovakia under-21 international footballers
FC DAC 1904 Dunajská Streda players
FC ŠTK 1914 Šamorín players
Slovak Super Liga players
2. Liga (Slovakia) players
Expatriate footballers in England
Slovak expatriate sportspeople in England
People with acquired Slovak citizenship
Sportspeople from Trnava